is a dam in Kanazawa, Ishikawa Prefecture, Japan, completed in 2001.

References 

Dams in Ishikawa Prefecture
Dams completed in 2001
Buildings and structures in Kanazawa, Ishikawa